Isaac Barrientos Flores (25 May 1966 – 14 June 1987) was a Puerto Rican boxer. He competed in the men's super heavyweight event at the 1984 Summer Olympics. He was shot dead in San Juan, Puerto Rico, aged 21.

References

External links
 

1966 births
1987 deaths
Puerto Rican male boxers
Olympic boxers of Puerto Rico
Boxers at the 1984 Summer Olympics
Place of birth missing
Deaths by firearm in Puerto Rico
Male murder victims
Super-heavyweight boxers
Puerto Rican murder victims